Mel Brown (12 November 1911 – 23 August 1995) was an  Australian rules footballer who played with South Melbourne in the Victorian Football League (VFL).

Notes

External links 

1911 births
1995 deaths
Australian rules footballers from Victoria (Australia)
Sydney Swans players